Senator Cooley may refer to:

James E. Cooley (1802–1882), New York State Senate
Wes Cooley (1932–2015), Oregon State Senate